Mencken is a surname of German origin. It may refer to:

August Mencken Jr. (1889–1967), American civil engineer and author
August Mencken Sr. (1854–1899), American cigar maker
H. L. Mencken (1880–1956), American writer

See also
Menken

German-language surnames